Nelson da Silva (? – before 1997) was a Brazilian footballer who played in the League of Ireland with Derry City F.C. in the late 1980s. He was married and died young at some point before 1997.

Honours
 League of Ireland First Division Shield: 1
 Derry City F.C. 1985-86

References

Brazilian footballers
Brazilian expatriate footballers
Da Silva, Nelson
Da Silva, Nelson
Da Silva, Nelson
Association football forwards
Date of birth missing
Date of death missing